George Francis Atkinson (January 26, 1854 – November 14, 1918) was an American botanist and mycologist.

He was born on January 26, 1854, in Raisinville, Michigan, and died on November 14, 1918. He was the son of Joseph and Josephine Atkinson (née Fish). He studied at Olivet College from 1878 to 1883 and obtained his bachelor's degree from Cornell University in 1885. He is best known for his contributions to the fields of mycology and botany.

Career

He was an assistant professor of entomology and zoology from 1885 to 1886, and associate professor in 1886 to 1888 at the University of North Carolina. He was a professor of botany and zoology at the University of South Carolina from 1888 to 1889 and a botanist at the Experiment Station of the University. From 1889 to 1892 he taught biology at the Agricultural and Mechanical College of Alabama; from 1892 to 1893 he was an assistant professor of cryptogamic botany at Cornell University, then associate professor (1893–1896), and from 1896, Chairman of the Botany Department. He was President of the Botanical Society of America in 1907 and was elected to the National Academy of Sciences in the Spring of 1918. His herbarium of fungus specimens is at the Cornell Plant Pathology Herbarium (CUP).

Atkinson died from influenza and pneumonia on November 14, 1918.

Eponymous taxa

Atkinsonella Diehl
Amanita atkinsoniana Coker
Armillaria atkinsoniana (Coker) Locq.
Boletus atkinsonianus
Calonectria atkinsonii
Cercospora atkinsonii
Ceriomyces atkinsonianus
Conocybe atkinsonii
Corticium atkinsonii
Cortinarius atkinsonianus
Galerina atkinsoniana
Ganoderma atkinsonii
Kirschsteiniothelia atkinsonii
Kneiffia atkinsonii
Lachnocladium atkinsonii
Mycena atkinsoniana
Mycena atkinsonii
Peniophora atkinsonii
Phaeophleospora atkinsonii
Phlebia atkinsoniana
Puccinia atkinsoniana
Puccinia atkinsonii
Pulveroboletus atkinsonianus
Ramaria atkinsonii
Scoleciasis atkinsonii
Scoleconectria atkinsonii

See also
List of mycologists

References

External links
National Academy of Sciences Biographical Memoir
 
 

American mycologists
American phytopathologists
1854 births
1918 deaths
Deaths from Spanish flu
Cornell University alumni
Cornell University faculty
People from Monroe County, Michigan
19th-century American botanists
20th-century American botanists